Lingaraj (Lingaraj Pradhan) is a social activist, politician, socialist thinker working from Bargarh district in Western Odisha, involved in various social, environmental and farmers' issues.

Prior to joining AAP, he was long time associated with Samajwadi Jan Parishad, a political party founded by Kishen Pattanayak. He left AAP in 2015 after AAP expelled Yogendra yadav and other leader

Lingaraj does not use his surname Pradhan as he opposes caste based identity and decided to do away with honorary titles.

Activism

Farmers' movements
He is now one of the convenors of "Paschim Odisha Krushak Samanwayan Samiti" (Western Odisha Farmers Coordination Committee).

Physical attacks 
1997 he along with Lingaraj Azad were again attacked by company goons for his participation in the anti-mining movement in Kashipur.

Political career 

His active political career began in the year 2004 when he contested from Bargarh Assembly constituency and remained in second position by securing over 22,000 votes under the banner of Samajwadi Jan Parishad with support of Odisha Rajya Krushak Sangathan.

In 2009, he again contested from the same place, again finishing in third place.

He is contesting the 2014 Lok Sabha elections as a candidate from Bargarh (Lok Sabha constituency).

References 

1961 births
Living people
People from Odisha
Aam Aadmi Party candidates in the 2014 Indian general election
Jawaharlal Nehru University alumni
Aam Aadmi Party politicians
21st-century Indian politicians